Tell el-'Oueili (also Awayli) is a tell, or ancient settlement mound, located in Dhi Qar Governorate, southern Iraq. The site was excavated between 1976 and 1989 by French archaeologists under the direction of Jean-Louis Huot. The excavations have revealed occupation layers predating those of Eridu, making Tell el-'Oueili the earliest known human settlement in southern Mesopotamia.

History of research
The site was first noted and surveyed by French scholar André Parrot, who at the time was working at nearby Larsa. Two small excavation seasons took place in 1976 and 1978, and regular excavations commenced in 1981. Four more seasons took place in every uneven year until 1989. All excavations were directed by French archaeologist Jean-Louis Huot.

Tell el-'Oueili and its environment
It is located ca.  southeast of Larsa in Dhi Qar Governorate, southern Iraq. The environment of 'Oueili is characterized by temperatures that can reach more than 50 °C in summer and less than 250 mm of annual rainfall, making the area unsuitable for rainfed agriculture.

Occupation history
Tell el-'Oueili was occupied during the Ubaid period. The excavations have revealed occupation layers dating from Ubaid 0 (6500-5400 BCE) to Ubaid 4. The phase Ubaid 0 was first discovered at this site and was hence provisionally termed 'Oueili-phase. A surface survey showed that the site was occupied into the Uruk Period.

See also
History of Mesopotamia

References

1976 archaeological discoveries
Archaeological sites in Iraq
Dhi Qar Governorate
Ubaid period
Tells (archaeology)